Austin Stacks is a hurling and Gaelic football club based in Tralee in County Kerry, Ireland. Founded in 1917, the club has more All-Ireland Senior Football Championship medals and GAA All-Stars than any other Gaelic Athletic Association (GAA) club in Ireland.

History

Origins
Founded in 1917, the club is named after Austin Stack, Irish revolutionary and captain of the All-Ireland winning Kerry Gaelic football team of 1904. They are the only club in Kerry to have won Senior County Championships in both hurling and football, including doubles in 1928 and 1931.

Gaelic football
The club won the 1976–77 All-Ireland Senior Club Football Championship.

Notable players with the club have included Joe Barrett, Mikey Sheehy, Ger Power, John O'Keeffe, Cork's Dinny Long, William Kirby, Kieran Donaghy (who won player of the year after leading Kerry to success in 2006) and Daniel Bohane. The club has more All-Ireland Senior Football Championship medals and GAA All-Stars than any other GAA club in Ireland.

One year after winning the competition, following a 3-22 to 1-15 loss to Kenmare Shamrock during the 2022 Kerry Senior Football Championship, Austin Stacks were relegated from the Senior Championship for the first time in their history.

Hurling
Austin Stacks have won the Kerry Senior Hurling Championship 4 times. They won the Kerry Junior Hurling Championship in 2012, 2015 and 2016. They now play in the Intermediate Championship. They also won Minor County Championships in 1955, 1967 and 1986.

All Ireland Senior medal winners

 Ger Power	(8)	1975, 1978, 1979, 1980, 1981, 1984, 1985, 1986	
 Mikey Sheehy	(8)	1975, 1978, 1979, 1980, 1981, 1984, 1985, 1986	
 John O'Keeffe	(7)	1969, 1970, 1975, 1978, 1979, 1980, 1981		
 Joe Barrett	(6)	1924, 1926, 1929, 1930, 1931, 1932			
 Jackie Ryan	(6)	1924, 1926, 1929, 1930, 1931, 1932			
 Micko Doyle	(5)	1929, 1930, 1931, 1932, 1937				
 John Joe Purty Landers	(5)	1929, 1930, 1931, 1932, 1937				
 Tim Roundy Landers	(5)	1931, 1932, 1937, 1939, 1941				
 Ger O'Keeffe	(4)	1975, 1979, 1980, 1981					
 Kieran Donaghy	(4)	2006, 2007, 2009, 2014					
 Denis Rory O'Connell	(3)	1924, 1926, 1929						
 Jimmy Gawksie Gorman	(3)	1939, 1940, 1941						
 Jimmy Baily	(3)	1924, 1926, 1929						
 Daniel Bohan	(3)	2006, 2007, 2009						
 Ned Pedlar Sweeney	(2)	1929, 1930							
 Tommy Barrett	(2)	1930, 1931							
 Dan Ryan	(2)	1930, 1931							
 Martin Bracker O'Regan	(2)	1931, 1932							
 William Kirby	(2)	1997, 2004							
 Bill Landers	(2)	1924, 1932							
 Gerry Pluggy Moriarty	(2)	1924, 1926							
 Tom O'Connor	(1)	1929								
 Michael Healy	(1)	1932								
 Jo Jo Barrett	(1)	1962								
 John L McElligott	(1)	1979								
 Pa Laide	(1)	1997								
 John Gal Slattery	(1)	1926								
 Shane O'Callaghan	(1) 2014	
 Fearghal MacNamara	(1) 2014
 Joe O'Connor (1) 2022
 Dylan Casy (1) 2022
 Greg Horan (1) 2022
 Jack O'Shea (1) 2022

Roll of honour
 Kerry Senior Football Championship (13): 1928, 1930, 1931, 1932, 1936, 1973, 1975, 1976, 1979, 1986, 1994, 2014, 2021
 Munster Club Champions (2): 1976, 2014
 All Ireland Club Champions (1): 1977
 Kerry County Football League – Division 1 (11): 1973, 1974, 1975, 1978, 1979, 1980, 1982, 1990, 2011, 2014, 2019
 Kerry County Football League – Division 2 (1): 2010
 Senior Club Football Championships (5): 1979, 2003, 2016, 2019, 2020, 2021
 Kerry Senior Hurling Championships (3): 1928, 1929, 1931, 
 Kerry County Hurling League  – Division 3 (1): 2017
 Kerry Junior Hurling Championship (3): 2012, 2015, 2016
 Kerry Minor Hurling Championships (3): 1955, 1967, 1986
 Kerry Under-21 Football Championship (1): 2002
 Kerry Minor Football Championship (2): 1969, 1980
 Kerry Minor Football League – Division 1 (6): 1973, 1979, 1994, 2000, 2013, 2017
 Under-21 Club Football Championship (1): 2008

County championship winning captains

Football

1928: Joe Barrett
1930: Joe Barrett
1931: Joe Barrett
1932: Joe Barrett
1936: Miko Doyle
1973: Billy Curtin
1975: Joe Joe Barrett
1976: John O'Keeffe
1979: Ger Power
1986: Mike Counihan
1994: Pat Slattery
2014: Barry Shanahan
2021: Dylan Casey

Hurling (Senior)

1928: Joe Barrett
1929: Dan Rayn
1931: Joe Barrett

Hurling (Junior)
2012: Andrew Morrissey
2015: Danny Maguire
2016: Andrew Foley

Notable players
Joe Barrett
Daniel Bohan
Liam Kearns
William Kirby
Pa Laide
Dinny Long
Joe O'Connor, 2022 All-Ireland SFC-winning captain
Ger O'Keeffe
John O'Keeffe
Ger Power
Gary Scollard
Mikey Sheehy

Notable teams

References

External links
Official Austin Stacks GAA Club website

Gaelic games clubs in County Kerry
Gaelic football clubs in County Kerry
Hurling clubs in County Kerry
Sport in Tralee